Tutova is a commune in Vaslui County, Western Moldavia, Romania. It is composed of six villages: Bădeana, Ciortolom, Coroiu, Crivești, Tutova and Vizureni. It included four other villages until 2004, when these were split off to form Pochidia Commune.

References

Communes in Vaslui County
Localities in Western Moldavia